Arlington is a city in Reno County, Kansas, United States. As of the 2020 census, the population of the city was 435.

History

Arlington was founded in 1877. It was named after Arlington, Massachusetts. The first post office in Arlington was established in February 1878.

In 1887, the Chicago, Kansas and Nebraska Railway built a main line from Herington through Arlington to Pratt. In 1888, this line was extended to Liberal. Later, it was extended to Tucumcari, New Mexico and El Paso, Texas. It foreclosed in 1891 and taken over by Chicago, Rock Island and Pacific Railway, which shut down in 1980, reorganized as Oklahoma, Kansas and Texas Railroad, merged in 1988 with Missouri Pacific Railroad, and merged in 1997 with Union Pacific Railroad. Most locals still refer to this railroad as the "Rock Island".

In 1980, Arlington (with 503 residents at the time) was profiled by the Associated Press as a town that "has not had a murder in its entire history". The police chief at the time, Ralph Almquist, had been hired in 1974, marking the first time that Arlington had had a full-time police force, and boasted that "We don't have any murders here because I don't allow crime."

Geography
Arlington is located at  (37.896363, -98.179313).

Demographics

2010 census
As of the census of 2010, there were 473 people, 200 households, and 124 families residing in the city. The racial makeup of the city was 98.3% White, 0.6% African American, 0.2% Native American, and 0.8% from two or more races. Hispanic or Latino people of any race were 1.3% of the population.

There were 200 households, of which 31.0% had children under the age of 18 living with them, 48.0% were married couples living together, 11.0% had a female householder with no husband present, 3.0% had a male householder with no wife present, and 38.0% were non-families. 32.5% of all households were made up of individuals, and 12% had someone living alone who was 65 years of age or older. The average household size was 2.37 and the average family size was 3.02.

The median age in the city was 37.4 years. 26.6% of residents were under the age of 18; 7.8% were between the ages of 18 and 24; 22.8% were from 25 to 44; 25.4% were from 45 to 64; and 17.5% were 65 years of age or older. The gender makeup of the city was 50.1% male and 49.9% female.

2000 census
As of the census of 2000, there were 459 people, 202 households, and 136 families residing in the city. The racial makeup of the city was 97.60% White, 0.22% African American, 0.22% Native American, 0.44% from other races, and 1.53% from two or more races. Hispanic or Latino people of any race were 1.31% of the population.

There were 202 households, out of which 29.7% had children under the age of 18 living with them, 58.4% were married couples living together, 6.9% had a female householder with no husband present, and 32.2% were non-families. 30.2% of all households were made up of individuals, and 18.3% had someone living alone who was 65 years of age or older. The average household size was 2.27 and the average family size was 2.82.

In the city, the population was spread out, with 25.3% under the age of 18, 4.6% from 18 to 24, 23.1% from 25 to 44, 23.5% from 45 to 64, and 23.5% who were 65 years of age or older. The median age was 41 years. For every 100 females, there were 98.7 males. For every 100 females age 18 and over, there were 84.4 males.

The median income for a household in the city was $29,453, and the median income for a family was $38,571. Males had a median income of $26,250 versus $20,250 for females. The per capita income for the city was $14,289. About 4.4% of families and 8.8% of the population were below the poverty line, including 10.0% of those under age 18 and 11.1% of those age 65 or over.

Education
The community is served by Fairfield USD 310 public school district.  Before the creation of USD 310, the old Arlington High School mascot was the Warriors.

References

Further reading

External links
 Arlington - Directory of Public Officials
 Arlington city map, KDOT

Cities in Kansas
Cities in Reno County, Kansas
1877 establishments in Kansas
Populated places established in 1877